Heinz Koll is a rugby union player. He plays for Namibia. He played for London Wasps during the 2011/12 season. He was released from Wasps on 11 May 2012.

References

Living people
Namibian people of German descent
Namibian rugby union players
Wasps RFC players
White Namibian people
Namibia international rugby union players
Year of birth missing (living people)
Rugby union locks